The Kvindebasketligaen is the premier championship for women's basketball clubs in Denmark. It was created in 1971, and it is currently contested by eight teams. It was known as Dameligaen until 2021-2022 season. The champion qualifies for the next season's FIBA Eurocup. SISU Copenhague is the championship's most successful club with 20 titles, followed by Hørsholm 79ers with 9 titles.

2017-18 teams
 Hørsholm 79'ers
 Lemvig
 SISU
 Stevnsgade Basketball
 Værløse
 Virum Vipers
Source

List of champions

 1971 SISU
 1972 SISU
 1973 Falcon
 1974 SISU
 1975 SISU
 1976 SISU
 1977 SISU
 1978 USG
 1979 USG 
 1980 Virum
 1981 SISU
 1982 SISU
 1983 SISU
 1984 SISU
 1985 SISU

 1986 Horsens
 1987 SISU
 1988 SISU
 1989 Amager
 1990 SISU
 1991 Falcon 
 1992 SISU
 1993 Horsens
 1994 Amager
 1995 Amager
 1996 Hørsholm
 1997 Åbyhøj
 1998 SISU
 1999 Falcon 
 2000 Falcon 

 2001 Åbyhøj
 2002 Herlev
 2003 BF Copenhagen
 2004 Hørsholm
 2005 Hørsholm
 2006 Hørsholm
 2007 Hørsholm
 2008 Hørsholm
 2009 Amager
 2010 Hørsholm
 2011 SISU
 2012 SISU
 2013 SISU
 2014 SISU
 2015 Hørsholm

 2016 Virum GO Dream
 2017 Virum GO Dream
 2018 Hørsholm 79ers
 2019 BK Amager
 2020 Cancelled due to COVID-19 outbreak
 2021 BMS Herlev Wolfpack
 2022 AKS Falcon

References

Basketball in Denmark
Denmark
Sports leagues established in 1971
Professional sports leagues in Denmark